Ray Congdon De Yoe (April 17, 1876 -  September 25, 1933), also known as Ray C. De Yoe served in the California State Assembly for the 48th district from 1929 to 1931. He was president of the Carmel Realty Company and had real estate holdings in Monterey County, California, including the De Yoe Building in Carmel built by Michael J. Murphy.

Early life
De Yoe was born in Alamo Township, Michigan on April 17, 1876, to Anson Serinar Deyoe (1845–1906) and Rosette J. Congdon (1854–1908). In 1879, his parents moved to San Luis Obispo county. De Yoe served in the Spanish–American War.

He married Maud May (1877-1954) on June 30, 1913, in Carmel-by-the-Sea, California. They had one child. At age 42, during World War I, De Yoe registered for the draft at the local board for Monterey County.

Career

Political life
On November 7, 1928, De Yoe won the election in the California State Assembly for the California's 48th State Assembly district. He served from 1929 to 1931. In April 1929, DeYoe introduced legislature for a bill that he and Carmel city attorney Argyll Campbell drew up, to allow the formation of public airport districts for Monterey, Pacific Grove, and Carmel. De Yoe was a member of the Livestock and Dairy Committee and helped pass the law which gave dairymen payment by the state for cattle condemned and slaughtered because of tuberculosis.

De Yoe ran again for the Assembly in November 1930, against Chris N. Jespersen for the California's 43rd State Assembly district of Monterey and San Luis Obispo County. His campaign was backed by Carmel Martin, Monterey attorney, and a large group of Monterey County  citizens. He lost to Jespersen, who received the majority of the votes.

Real estate
De Yoe was president of the Carmel Realty Company and had real estate holdings in Monterey County, California, including the Tudor Revival De Yoe Building (1924); the Art Shop, later called Tuck Box (1926), and adjacent property; and the Spanish Eclectic Las Tiendas Building (1930) in Carmel-by-the-Sea, California, all designed and built by Michael J. Murphy. The De Yoe building on Dolores Stsreet was the home of the Carmel Pine Cone offices and the Carmelita Hat Shoppe.

Death
De Yoe died on September 25, 1933 in Carmel, at age 57, from an infection that started when he scratched his finger on a rose bush. A funeral service was held at Carmel. The Carmel Pine Cone reported that "every business in his village, closed its doors for the hour of his funeral."

References

United States Navy personnel of the Spanish–American War
1876 births
Republican Party members of the California State Assembly
1933 deaths
20th-century American politicians